Sebastián Moyano may refer to:

 Sebastián Moyano (footballer), Argentine footballer
 Sebastián de Belalcázar, Spanish conquistador